The 2015 World Snowshoe Championships was the 8th edition of the global snowshoe running competition, World Snowshoe Championships, organised by the World Snowshoe Federation and took place in Quebec City on 31 January 2015.

Results
The race, held on the distance of 10 km, has compiled two different ranking (male and female) overall, it was the mass start system and more than 200 snowshoers participated in it.

Male Overall

Women's overall

References

External links
 World Snowshoe Federation official web site

World Snowshoe Championships